Hyetussa is a genus of the spider family Salticidae (jumping spiders).

Species
As of May 2018, the World Spider Catalog lists the following species in the genus:
 Hyetussa aguilari Galiano, 1978 – Peru
 Hyetussa alternata Gertsch, 1936 - United States
 Hyetussa andalgalaensis Galiano, 1976 – Argentina
 Hyetussa complicata Gertsch, 1936 - United States
 Hyetussa cribrata (Simon, 1901) – Paraguay, Argentina
 Hyetussa mesopotamica Galiano, 1976 – Argentina
 Hyetussa secta (Mello-Leitão) – Argentina
 Hyetussa sergipe Bustamante & Ruiz, 2017 - Brazil
 Hyetussa simoni Galiano, 1976 (type species) – Venezuela
 Hyetussa tremembe Bustamante & Ruiz, 2017 - Brazil

References

Salticidae
Spiders of South America
Salticidae genera